Escardes is a commune in the Marne department in north-eastern France.

The inhabitants of Escardes are called Escardiens and their number was 70 in 2018. The town's area is 14.5 km².

See also
Communes of the Marne department

References

Communes of Marne (department)